L'Amour et Psyché, enfants is an oil painting by William Adolphe Bouguereau in 1890. It is currently in a private collection. It was displayed in the Salon of Paris in 1890, the year Bouguereau was President of the Société des Artistes Français. The painting features Greek mythological figures Eros and Psyché, sharing an embrace and kiss. Bouguereau was a Classical-style painter in the Neoclassical era of art. The painting is characterized by the frothy background the figures delicately stand on. It depicts the beginning of the forbidden romance of Cupid and Psyche, a popular subject at the time of execution.

Subject Matter
The resurgence of interest in Classical Greek and Roman mythology of the mid-eighteenth century gave way for the renderings to the story of Cupid and Psyche. The daughter of a King and Queen, Psyche was born with beauty that led to men worshipping her. This angered Venus, Cupid's mother and Goddess of Beauty. She sent Cupid to prick her with his arrow, forcing her to fall in love with a hideous creature as revenge. Instead, Cupid scratches himself with his own arrow and falls in love with Psyche. He marries her in secrecy on the condition that she may never see his face. He flees when her curiosity gets the better of her. Psyche roams the earth and underworld in search of her lover. They eventually reunite and she is granted the gift of immortality. Their triumph over adversity from Venus and their differences in mortality makes this theme popular.

William Bouguereau chooses to portray the characters of Cupid and Psyche as young children, almost babies. Cupid, the Roman interpretation of Eros, is often portrayed as a fantastic, mischievous winged baby with a bow and arrow. Eros, the Greek equivalent, is often depicted as a young man, which is when the love affair between him and Psyche plays out. Instead, the viewer sees Cupid as a baby, with Psyche also portrayed as a young child, though typically through art history she is seen as a young woman. Bouguereau chooses to paint her with butterfly wings, for psyche was the Greek word given to butterflies by Aristotle. Psyche is a symbol to the transformation of the human soul, as she transforms from human to immortal. The decision to paint the characters as children is a reference to their innocence, before the corruption of their affair by Venus. This depiction would have been widely accepted in the Salon it was shown at. Bouguereau applied this story in multiple paintings of his, depicting them as the more familiar young lovers.

Composition

The characters of Cupid and Psyche are fixed onto a long, vertical canvas. They appear long and larger than life. Cupid places a leg on a cloud for balance, and similarly balances the frame. Limbs interconnect in soft embraces. Bouguereau catches Cupid and Psyche in an inhale of breath, placing a light peck on Psyche's cheek. Her hand almost pushes Cupid away, and she looks down and away from him. The blue cloth floats behind them and onto the surrounding clouds. The focus is on the subjects, who are above the earthly realm and gracefully play in the sky.

The style in which Bouguereau chooses to paint the children is articulated and meaningful. Their white flesh is luminous and rosy- a symbol of their purity. Wings sprout delicately from their shoulders. Bouguereau invokes whimsical elements of childhood and young love through the use of pastels and soft, velvety brushstrokes. The painting is mostly blue, an uncommon color for the portrayal of a love story. By not using pinks and reds, the painter steers away from the theme of forbidden love and towards the idea of young love. The colors are cool and crisp. Bouguereau takes care to accurately portray the pudginess of Cupid and Psyche. The painting is full of texture from the light fabrics, wispy golden hair, and smoothness of their skin.

Other paintings by Bouguereau on Cupid and Psyche 
Bouguereau was inspired by the story of Cupid and Psyche several times:
 Psyché et l'Amour (Psyche and Cupid, Salon of 1889, No. 260; Exposition Universelle of 1900, No. 242)
 Psyché (1892)
 Le ravissement de Psyché (The Abduction of Psyche or The Rapture of Psyche, Salon of 1895, No. 258)

References
 Wissman, Fronia E. Bouguereau. San Francisco: Pomegranate Artbooks, 1996.
 Cavendish, Richard. Man, Myth and Magic: the Illustrated Encyclopedia of Mythology Volume 7. New York: Marshall Cavendish, 1995.
 Manos-Jones, Maraleen. The Spirit of Butterflies: Myth, Magic, and Art. New York: Henry N. Abrams, 2000.
 Elliot, Virgil. Traditional Oil Painting: Advanced Techniques and Concepts from the Renaissance to the Present. New York: Watson-Guptil, 2008.

Notes

See also 
 Cupid and Psyche

External links 
 Web Museum

Mythological paintings by William-Adolphe Bouguereau
1890 paintings
Paintings of Cupid
Cupid and Psyche